Chionodes violacea is a moth of the family Gelechiidae. It is found from Scandinavia to Russia (Siberia, Uljanovsk, Kamchatka) and Mongolia.

The wingspan is 15–17 mm. Adults have been recorded on wing from June to July.

References

Moths described in 1848
Chionodes
Moths of Europe
Moths of Asia